KMIQ (104.9 FM, Super Q 104.9) is a radio station broadcasting a tejano music format. Licensed to Robstown, Texas, United States, the station serves the Corpus Christi area.  The station is currently owned by Cotton Broadcasting.

References

External links
 KMIQ Facebook
 

MIQ